Alley Cat is the debut album by Danish pianist Bent Fabric. The album features the Grammy Award-winning single "Alley Cat", and was a charting album in 1962-63.

The title song is used as a recurring gag on the short-lived 1990 TV show Get a Life.

The cover was designed by Haig Adishian, and was a Billboard Album Cover of the Week in October 1962.

Track listing
Alley Cat (2:24)
Across The Alley From The Alamo (2:11)
You Made Me Love You (3:03)
Trudie (1:56)
Markin' Time (1:38)
In The Arms Of My Love (2:28)
Delilah (2:15)
Catsanova Walk (1:58)
Symphony (2:19)
Early Morning In Copenhagen (2:22)
Comme Ci, Comme Ca (2:06)
Baby Won't You Please Come Home (2:50)

References

External links
 

Atco Records albums
Swing albums
1962 debut albums
Bent Fabric albums